Desmond Fretwell (born 13 July 1955) is a British former cyclist. He competed in the team time trial event at the 1980 Summer Olympics. He also represented England in the road race, at the 1978 Commonwealth Games in Edmonton, Alberta, Canada.

References

External links
 

1955 births
Living people
British male cyclists
Olympic cyclists of Great Britain
Cyclists at the 1980 Summer Olympics
Cyclists at the 1978 Commonwealth Games
Place of birth missing (living people)
Commonwealth Games competitors for England
20th-century British people